American rock supergroup A Perfect Circle has recorded material for four studio albums. The band's music is mostly written by the band's two core members and founders, guitarist Billy Howerdel and Tool vocalist Maynard James Keenan, the former writing the music, and the latter writing the lyrics and vocal melodies. However, due to the commitments of its participants, band membership has fluctuated over time, leading recordings to vary when it comes to performance credits. The original incarnation of the band included Paz Lenchantin on bass, Troy Van Leeuwen on guitar, and Josh Freese on drums; though Primus drummer Tim Alexander had briefly stood in as a drummer prior to Freese in the band's initial live shows prior to releasing any material. Band collaborator and producer Danny Lohner and Marilyn Manson bassist Jeordie White were also members for a short period in the early 2000s. The band's current lineup features former Smashing Pumpkins guitarist James Iha, bassist Matt McJunkins, and drummer Jeff Friedl, the latter two also being contributors to Keenan's Puscifer and Howerdel's Ashes Divide projects.

After forming in 1999, the band released their debut album, Mer de Noms in 2000, featuring three singles, "Judith", "The Hollow", and "3 Libras", all of which hit the top 20 of both the Billboard US Modern Rock and  Mainstream Rock charts, and helped propel the album to platinum sales four months after release. A follow up album, Thirteenth Step, was released in 2003, featured the band's best performing songs: "Weak and Powerless" topped the Mainstream and Modern Rock charts, "The Outsider", hit the top five in both, and both crossed over onto the all-format Billboard Hot 100 chart, at number 61 and 79 respectively. A third single, "Blue", also hit the top 20 of the Mainstream Rock chart. Initially planning to enter a hiatus after the second album, they stuck together to release a third album, a collection of radically re-worked, politically-motivated cover songs titled Emotive in time for the 2004 United States presidential election. Two singles came from the release, a cover of John Lennon's "Imagine" and "Passive", a song originating from the cancelled Tapeworm project with Trent Reznor of Nine Inch Nails.

After entering a hiatus in 2005, band activity was sporadic in the coming years. The band reformed in 2010, but would not release any new songs until 2013, with the single release of "By and Down" for their greatest hits album Three Sixty. After another period of inactivity, the band recorded a fourth studio album, Eat the Elephant, released on April 20, 2018. For the release, the band worked with an outside music producer, Dave Sardy, for the first time.

The large variations in composition and sound of the band's recorded material has led to them being described as many different sub-genres of rock and metal music, though critics generally agree that the band has been a major influences on modern rock. Reviewers from outlets such as AllMusic and Rolling Stone cited their work as rare examples of relevance and quality in contemporary rock music. with Music OMH even asserting that the band had "literally defined alternative rock as we know it."

Songs

Notes

References

Perfect Circle